Every Other Weekend is a 1990  French drama film written and directed by Nicole Garcia. It marked the directorial debut of Garcia.
 
It premiered out of competition at the 47th Venice International Film Festival. It was nominated for two César Award, for best debut film and for best actress (to Nathalie Baye).

Cast 

 Nathalie Baye : Camille Valmont
 Felice Pasotti : Gaëlle 
 Joachim Serreau : Vincent 
 Miki Manojlović : Adrian
 Henri Garcin :   Camille's Agent
 Marie Daëms : Graziella Jacquet
 Jacques Boudet : Jacquet
 Sacha Briquet : Albert

References

External links

1990 films
1990 drama films
French drama films
Films directed by Nicole Garcia
Films about divorce
1990 directorial debut films
1990s French-language films
1990s French films